The Madagascar sea catfish (Arius madagascariensis) is a species of fish in the family Ariidae. It is found in Madagascar, Mozambique, and Tanzania. Its natural habitats are rivers, freshwater lakes, shallow seas, and estuarine waters. The Madagascar Sea Catfish has a common length of 20 centimeters, but may reach 70 centimeters.

References

Susan M. Luna  http://www.fishbase.us/Summary/SpeciesSummary.php?ID=1291&AT=Duri

Arius (fish)
Taxonomy articles created by Polbot
Fish described in 1894